The Fairbury Rock Island Depot and Freight House in Fairbury, Nebraska is a historic railroad station and freight house complex which served trains of the Chicago, Rock Island and Pacific Railroad (Rock Island Line). The Renaissance Revival passenger station began construction in 1913 and had a grand opening on February 10, 1914. The second story of the station housed the Western Division Headquarters for the railroad. The passenger station served trains including the Rock Island's Rocky Mountain Rocket  from Chicago to Colorado Springs and Denver. When the Rocky Mountain Rocket was terminated on October 15, 1966, the Rock Island's passenger service was discontinued at Fairbury. The division offices had been relocated a year earlier. The adjacent metal freight house was constructed in 1940 and served the railroad until 1963.

Both buildings were listed on the National Register of Historic Places on June 21, 1996. The passenger station is now occupied by a museum.

References 
 Ahlgren, Carol. Fairbury Rock Island Depot and Freight House National Register of Historic Places Inventory-Nomination Form, 1996. On file at the National Park Service.

Railway stations in the United States opened in 1914
National Register of Historic Places in Jefferson County, Nebraska
Railway stations on the National Register of Historic Places in Nebraska
Fairbury
Railway stations closed in 1966
1914 establishments in Nebraska
Former railway stations in Nebraska